Sharpe is an unincorporated community in Marshall County, Kentucky, United States.

Thomas Rickman (1940-2018), American screenwriter, was born in Sharpe.

Notes

Unincorporated communities in Marshall County, Kentucky
Unincorporated communities in Kentucky